Lawrence Township is a township in Cloud County, Kansas, United States.   its population was 146.

History
Lawrence Township was organized in 1872. It was named for L. D. Lawrence, a pioneer settler.

Geography
According to the USGS, it contains two cemeteries: Hollis and Walnut Grove.

The streams of Little Upton Creek, Oak Creek, Plum Creek, Salt Creek, Upton Creek and West Creek run through this township.

References

 USGS Geographic Names Information System (GNIS)

External links
 US-Counties.com
 City-Data.com

Townships in Cloud County, Kansas
Townships in Kansas